Ramakrishna Stadium is a  multi-purpose stadium in Narendrapur, South 24 Parganas district. The ground is mainly used for organizing matches of football, cricket, and other sports. The ground has floodlights so that the stadium can host day-night matches. It complies with all norms of BCCI so that Ranji Trophy matches can be played there. The stadium was established in 1998 when they hosted a match of Vijay Hazare Trophy between Central Zone Under-16s and North Zone Under-16s  but since then the stadium has not hosted any senior cricket matches.

References

External links 
 cricketarchive
 Rama Krishna Mission 

Sports venues in West Bengal
Cricket grounds in West Bengal
Sports venues in Kolkata
Ramakrishna Mission
South 24 Parganas district
1997 establishments in West Bengal
Sports venues completed in 1997
20th-century architecture in India